Haugk is a German surname. Notable people with the surname include:

Dietrich Haugk (1925-2015), German film director and voice actor
Else Haugk (1889-1973), Swiss aviator
Helmut Haugk (1914-1992), German flying ace
Werner Haugk (1912-1944), German flying ace

Lists of people by surname
German-language surnames